Polenz may refer to:

Polenz (river), a river of Saxony, Germany

People with that surname

Ruprecht Polenz (born 1946), German politician, member of the CDU party
Jérome Polenz (born 1986), retired German footballer

German toponymic surnames